Robert Burwell Fulton (April 8, 1849 – May 29, 1919) was an American university administrator. He served as the seventh chancellor of the University of Mississippi in Oxford, Mississippi from 1892 to 1906.

Biography

Early life
He was born in Sumter County, Alabama on April 8, 1849. He graduated from the University of Mississippi in Oxford, Mississippi in 1869.

Career
He taught in Alabama and in New Orleans, Louisiana. In 1871, he became Assistant Professor of Physics and Astronomy at the University of Mississippi in Oxford, Mississippi. By 1875, he was a full Professor. He went on to serve as its seventh Chancellor from 1892 to 1906.

Additionally, he served as president of the National Association of State Universities for five years.

Personal life
He married Annie Rose Garland Fulton (1843-1893), the daughter of Landon Garland (1810-1895), who served as the second President of Randolph-Macon College in Ashland, Virginia from 1836 to 1846, third president of the University of Alabama from 1855 to 1865, and first chancellor of Vanderbilt University from 1875 to 1893. They had two sons and one daughter who died in infancy, and one son who survived: 
Landon Garland Fulton (1872-1874).
Louise Garland Fulton (1873-1874).
Robert Garland Fulton (1875-1877).
Maurice Garland Fulton (1877–1955; Professor of English at New Mexico Military Institute in Roswell, New Mexico).

Annie died in 1893, and he remarried to Florence Thompson in 1903.

He died on May 29, 1919. He was buried in the Oxford Memorial Cemetery in Oxford, Mississippi.

References

1849 births
1919 deaths
People from Sumter County, Alabama
People from Oxford, Mississippi
University of Mississippi people